Dictyochloropsis reticulata is a species of green algae in the Trebouxiales. It is a known as a photobiont (photosynthetic symbiont) with several lichen species, like Lobaria pulmonaria, but also as a free-living soil alga as well. Phylogenetic analysis of rRNA sequence data revealed that the species shares a sister group relationship with two other green algae that lack motile stages, Chlorella saccharophila and C. luteoviridis.

References

Plants described in 1984
Trebouxiales